Warta Zawiercie, officially known for sponsorship reasons as Aluron CMC Warta Zawiercie, is a professional men's volleyball club based in Zawiercie in southern Poland, founded in 1972 and reestablished in 2011. Since the 2017–18 season, Warta Zawiercie has been playing in PlusLiga, the highest level league of Polish volleyball.

Team
As of 2022–23 season

Coaching staff
Players

Season by season

Former names

See also

References

External links
 Official website 
 Team profile at PlusLiga.pl 
 Team profile at Volleybox.net

Polish volleyball clubs
Sport in Silesian Voivodeship
Volleyball clubs established in 1972
1972 establishments in Poland